The Mine Creek Bridge, located east of Mound City in Linn County, Kansas, was built in 1927.  It was listed on the National Register of Historic Places in 1983.

It is a type of through arch bridge.

It was built by Maxwell Construction Company at a cost of $15,037.60.

See also
Battle of Mine Creek Site, also NRHP-listed in Linn County

References

Bridges on the National Register of Historic Places in Kansas
Bridges completed in 1927
Linn County, Kansas